Hubert Cailleau (c. 1526–1590), was a French historical and miniature painter and stage designer, who flourished at Valenciennes. There are some clever designs made by him, that now reside in the National Library at Paris, which were done for a mystery of the Passion acted at Valenciennes in 1547. He is famous for the illustrations of these sets, especially the frontispiece to The Passion and Resurrection of the Savior (1577), which are the most detailed surviving examples of such staging.

References
 
 Vince, Ronald W. A Companion to the Medieval Theatre. Greenwood Press, 1989.

16th-century French painters
French male painters
Year of birth unknown
Year of death unknown
Manuscript illuminators
Medieval drama
Year of birth uncertain